Michael Gladis (born August 30, 1977)  is an American actor. He played Paul Kinsey in the television series Mad Men; he appeared in the series' first three seasons, and as a guest star in the show's fifth season.

Early life
Gladis grew up in Farmington, Connecticut, graduating from Farmington High School in 1995. Inspiration for a life of acting originated from the time he spent volunteering for theater productions at Miss Porter's School, the internationally known all-girls school in town, where he knew male actors were needed.

He started his college career at the SUNY School of Art Design at Alfred University before transferring to State University of New York at New Paltz, from which he earned a B.A. in theatre in 1999.

Career
Prior to Mad Men, he played Eugene Rossi in four episodes of Third Watch. He formerly starred in the Adult Swim comedy Eagleheart. Gladis appeared in an episode of Law & Order: Special Victims Unit titled "Branded" and in an episode of Leverage titled "The 15 Minute Job".

He provided the voice and MotionScan of Dudley Lynch in the game L.A. Noire and was Senior Seaman Yevgeny Borzenkov in the 2002 film K19: The Widowmaker. In 2015, he portrayed Lieutenant Matias in the science fiction action film Terminator Genisys.

Personal life
As of July 10, 2016, Gladis was engaged to actress Beth Behrs. On July 21, 2018, they married at Moose Creek Ranch in Victor, Idaho, just outside Jackson Hole. On June 13, 2022, Behrs announced the birth of their daughter, Emma George Gladis. The date of birth was not revealed.

Filmography

Film

Television

Video game

References

External links

AMC Interview
Pipes Magazine Interview

1977 births
21st-century American male actors
American male film actors
American male television actors
Living people
State University of New York at New Paltz alumni
Male actors from Houston
Male actors from Connecticut
People from Farmington, Connecticut